Scutigera coleoptrata, also known as the house centipede, is a species of centipede that is typically yellowish-grey and has up to 15 pairs of long legs. Originating in the Mediterranean region, it has spread to other parts of the world, where it can live in human homes. It is an insectivore; it kills and eats other arthropods, such as insects and arachnids.

Etymology
In 1758, Carl Linnaeus described the species in the tenth edition of his Systema Naturae, giving the name Scolopendra coleoptrata, writing that it has a "coleopterated thorax" (similar to a coleopter). In 1801, Jean-Baptiste Lamarck separated scutigera from scolopendra, calling this species Scutigera coleoptrata. The word scutigera comes from "to bear" (gerere) and "shield" (scutum), because of the shape of the plates in the back of the chilopod.

Morphology
The body of an adult Scutigera coleoptrata is typically  in length, although larger specimens are sometimes encountered. Up to 15 pairs of long legs are attached to the rigid body. Together with the antennae they give the centipede an appearance of being  in length. The delicate legs enable it to reach surprising speeds of up to  running across floors, up walls and along ceilings. Its body is yellowish-grey and has three dark dorsal stripes running down its length; the legs also have dark stripes. S. coleoptrata has developed automimicry in that its tail-like hind legs present the appearance of antennae. When the centipede is at rest, it is not easy to tell its cranial end from its caudal end.

Unlike most other centipedes, house centipedes and their close relatives have well-developed faceted eyes.

Reproduction and development
House centipedes lay their eggs in spring. In a laboratory observation of 24 house centipedes, an average of 63 and a maximum of 151 eggs were laid. As with many other arthropods, the larvae look like miniature versions of the adult, albeit with fewer legs. Young centipedes have four pairs of legs when they are hatched. They gain a new pair with the first molting, and two pairs with each of their five subsequent moltings. Adults with 15 pairs of legs retain that number through three more molting stages (sequence 4-5-7-9-11-13-15-15-15-15 pairs).

House centipedes live anywhere from three to seven years, depending on the environment. They can start breeding in their third year. To begin mating, the male and female circle around each other. They initiate contact with their antennae. The male deposits his sperm on the ground and the female then uses it to fertilize her eggs.

Behavior and ecology

House centipedes feed on spiders, bed bugs, termites, cockroaches, silverfish, ants, and other household arthropods. They administer venom through forcipules. These are not part of their mandibles, so strictly speaking they sting rather than bite. They are mostly nocturnal hunters. Despite their developed eyes, they seem to rely mostly on their antennae when hunting. Their antennae are sensitive to both smells and tactile information. They use both their mandibles and their legs for holding prey. This way they can deal with several small insects at the same time. To capture prey they either jump onto it or use their legs in a technique described as "lassoing". Using their legs to beat prey has also been described. Like other centipedes they can stridulate.

In a feeding study, S. coleoptrata showed the ability to distinguish between possible prey, avoiding dangerous insects. They also adapted their feeding pattern to the type of hazard the prey might pose to them. For wasps, they retreat after applying the venom to give it time to take effect. When the centipede is in danger of becoming prey itself, it can detach any legs that have become trapped. House centipedes have been observed to groom their legs by curling around and grooming them with their forcipules.

In 1902, C. L. Marlatt, an entomologist with the United States Department of Agriculture, wrote a brief description of the house centipede:

Habitat

Outdoors, house centipedes prefer to live in cool, damp places. Centipede respiratory systems do not provide any mechanism for shutting the spiracles, and that is why they need an environment that protects them from dehydration and excessive cold. Most live outside, primarily under large rocks, piles of wood or leaves, in barkdust and especially in compost piles. They often emerge from hiding during the watering of gardens or flowerbeds. These centipedes can be found in almost any part of the house, although they are usually encountered in dark or dimly lit areas such as basements and garages. Inside the home, they can be found in bathrooms and lavatories, which tend to be humid, but they can also be found in drier places like offices, bedrooms and dining rooms. They are usually seen crawling along the ground or floor, but they are capable of climbing walls. The greatest likelihood of encountering them is in spring, when they emerge due to warmer weather and in autumn/fall, when the cooling weather forces them to seek shelter in human habitats.

Distribution
S. coleoptrata is indigenous to the Mediterranean region, but it has spread through much of Europe, Asia, North America and South America. It has also been introduced to Australia.

Biological details
The faceted eyes of S. coleoptrata are sensitive to daylight and very sensitive to ultraviolet light. They were shown to be able to visually distinguish between different mutations of Drosophila melanogaster. How this ability fits with its nocturnal lifestyle and underground natural habitat is still under study. They do not instantly change direction when light is suddenly shone at them, but will retreat to a darker hiding spot.

Some of the plates covering the body segments fused and became smaller during the evolution to the current state of S. coleoptrata. The resulting mismatch between body segments and dorsal plates (tergites) is the cause for this centipede's rigid body.

Tergites 10 and 11 are not fully developed and segment 18 does not have a sternite. This model deviates from descriptions by Lewis who identified only 7 tergites and 15 segments.

Another feature that sets S. coleoptrata apart from other centipedes is that their hemolymph was found to contain proteins for transporting oxygen.

The mitochondrial genome of S. coleoptrata has been sequenced. This opened up discussions on the taxonomy and phylogeny of this and related species.

Interaction with humans
Unlike its shorter-legged but larger tropical cousins, S. coleoptrata can live its entire life inside a building, usually on the ground levels of homes.  House centipedes commonly startle their unwitting housemates with their speed and appearance, but are not routinely dangerous to humans.  They are not aggressive and usually flee when disturbed or revealed from cover.  Sting attempts are therefore rare unless the centipede is cornered or aggressively handled.  Its small forcipules have difficulty penetrating skin, and even successful stings produce only mild, localized pain and swelling, similar to a bee sting.  Allergic reactions to centipede stings have been reported, but these are rare; most stings heal quickly and without complication.

References

Bibliography

External links

 House Centipede Fact Sheet

Scutigeromorpha
Biological control agents of pest insects
Animals described in 1758
Myriapods of Europe
Taxa named by Carl Linnaeus
Cosmopolitan arthropods
Centipedes of Australia